Stephen Walker is a British author and filmmaker. He was educated at Oxford and Harvard universities. He has directed or produced around 30 films, and was twice voted in the top 10 directors in the UK in Broadcast magazine. His production company is Walker George Films.

Writing
His first book, King of Cannes: Madness, Mayhem and the Movies (1999) was published by Bloomsbury and Penguin USA in 2000. Based on his BBC documentary Waiting for Harvey, it was described by The Guardian as “entertaining and hilarious.”

Shockwave: Countdown to Hiroshima (2005) his second book, tells the story of the three months before the dropping of the atomic bomb in August 1945. It was published by HarperCollins, winning favourable comparisons to John Hersey's classic postwar account Hiroshima. It received starred reviews from Booklist, Publishers Weekly and Kirkus Reviews and was described as “electrifying” (Chicago Tribune), "a page-turner" (Entertainment Weekly), and "stunning…among the most immediate and thrilling works of history I have ever read." (The Irish Times) The work is presently in development as a feature film at Working Title Films and Universal Pictures, with a screenplay by Hossein Amini and Cary Fukunaga set to direct. Shockwave was republished in a new edition in the United Kingdom by HarperCollins on 23 July 2020—the 75th anniversary of the world’s first atomic bomb.

Walker's non-fiction book Beyond: The Astonishing Story of the First Human to Leave Our Planet and Journey Into Space is set at the heart of the Cold War in the spring of 1961 when the US and the USSR raced to put the first human into space. The book is published by HarperCollins in the US and UK and is released to celebrate the sixtieth anniversary of Yuri Gagarin's successful orbit of the Earth, the first human to do so. In late September 2019, as part of his ongoing research, Stephen travelled to the Baikonur cosmodrome in the Kazakhstan desert to witness the launch of the latest Soyuz manned mission to the International Space Station. The rocket blasted off from the same pad as Gagarin in April 1961.

Film and Television
He has won a BAFTA, and was nominated for three further BAFTAs (including Best Documentary and Best Director) for his Channel 4 documentary, A Boy Called Alex, a film described by The Guardian as "glorious." He has also won an Emmy and two Rose d'Ors, Europe's most prestigious television prize. His film Young@Heart, the tale of a chorus of American seniors who sing rock music, won the Audience Award at the Los Angeles Film Festival in 2007 and went on to win a further 23 film festival audience awards worldwide, including in Paris, Sydney, Warsaw, Nashville, and Atlanta. Young@Heart was released in 250 theatres by Fox Searchlight in the US in 2008. A key scene from the movie where the late octogenarian Fred Knittle sings Coldplay's "Fix You" has had 2.5 million hits on YouTube.

Walker is currently developing A Boy Called Alex as a dramatised feature film for DNA Films and Film 4. The story is about a brilliant teenage musical prodigy at Eton College who suffers from the disease cystic fibrosis. The screenwriter is Tom Edge, who wrote for Netflix's hit series The Crown, and Judy, the 2019 biopic of singer Judy Garland.

Education and personal life
Stephen Walker was educated at St Paul's School, London, and Worcester College, Oxford, where he gained a BA in modern history. He subsequently won a John Lounsbery Fellowship to study as a postgraduate at Harvard University, receiving a master's degree in philosophy and history of science, before joining the BBC.

His former partner is the television producer and director Sally George, and they continue to run their company Walker George Films together. He lives in London and has one daughter. In his spare time, he flies a tiny plane for recreation.

Filmography
Prisoners in Time (1995)
Waiting for Harvey (1999)
Hardcore (2001)
Faking It: Punk Rocker to Orchestra Conductor (2002)
Hiroshima – A Day That Shook The World (2005) (drama-documentary)
Young@Heart (2007)
 Silver Surfers (2007)
 George Melly’s Last Stand (2008)
 Operation Mincemeat (2010)
 The Real Magnificent Men in their Flying Machines (Propellerheads) (2011)
 DOUBLE AGENT: The Eddie Chapman Story (2011)
 The Day I Got My Sight Back (2013)

References

Living people
Year of birth missing (living people)
British writers
British film directors
British television directors
Alumni of the University of Oxford
Harvard University alumni